Czyżów may refer to the following places:
Czyżów, Tarnów County in Lesser Poland Voivodeship (south Poland)
Czyżów, Wieliczka County in Lesser Poland Voivodeship (south Poland)
Czyżów, Łódź Voivodeship (central Poland)
Czyżów, Busko County in Świętokrzyskie Voivodeship (south-central Poland)
Czyżów, Kielce County in Świętokrzyskie Voivodeship (south-central Poland)